Thiruvegappura (also spelled Thiruvegapura) is a village in Pattambi Taluk Palakkad district in the state of Kerala, India. It is administered by the Thiruvegapuram gram panchayat.

Main roads passing through Thiruvegappura Panchayat are Ponnani - Palakkad road, Pattambi - Perinthalmanna Road, Pattambi - Valanchery road, and Pattambi - Kozhikode road. Tirur  - Shornur Railway line and Nilambur-Shoranur line passes through here. Nearest Municipal town is Valanchery in Malappuram district (about 6 km away).

The villages lies on the bank of river Thutha, a tributary to the Bharathapuzha River.

Demographics 
 India census, Thiruvegapura had a population of 29,810 with 14,333 males and 15,477 females.

References

External links 

Villages in Palakkad district
Gram panchayats in Palakkad district